Krystian Sanocki (born 5 August 1996) is a Polish professional footballer player who most recently played as a winger for Lech Poznań II.

Club career
On 5 August 2020, he joined GKS Katowice.

On 26 July 2022, he returned to the reserve team of Lech Poznań, signing a one-year contract.

Career statistics

Club

1 Including Polish Super Cup.

References

1996 births
People from Czarnków
Sportspeople from Greater Poland Voivodeship
Living people
Polish footballers
Association football wingers
Lech Poznań II players
Lech Poznań players
MKS Kluczbork players
Kotwica Kołobrzeg footballers
Warta Poznań players
Błękitni Stargard players
GKS Katowice players
I liga players
II liga players
III liga players